The 2010 Allsvenskan, part of the 2010 Swedish football season, was the 86th Allsvenskan season. It began on 13 March 2010 and ended on 7 November 2010. AIK were the defending champions. Malmö FF secured their 16th title in the last round after winning with 2–0 against Mjällby AIF.

Participating teams

Overview

League table

Positions by round

Note: Some matches are played out of phase with the corresponding round, positions are corrected in hindsight.

Results

Relegation play-offs

Gefle won 3–0 on aggregate.

Top goalscorers 
Including matches played on 31 October 2010; Source: fotbollskanalen

See also

 Competitions
 2010 Superettan
 2010 Svenska Cupen
 2010 Supercupen

 Team seasons
 2010 Djurgårdens IF season
 2010 Halmstads BK season
 2010 Malmö FF season

 Transfers
 List of Swedish football transfers winter 2009–2010
 List of Swedish football transfers summer 2010
 List of Swedish football transfers winter 2010–2011

Footnotes
A. After the victory in the relegation play-off against Assyriska FF in the last match of the 2009 season, supporters of Djurgården stormed the pitch, with at least one player in Assyriska being attacked by hooligans. As a penalty, Djurgårdens IF had to pay a fine of 200,000 SEK and play their next home match (the first of the 2010 season) without any spectators.

References

External links

 Official website 

Allsvenskan seasons
Swed
Swed
1